Marios Elia (born April 14, 1979, in Nicosia) is a retired Cypriot professional footballer and manager of the restaurant Ivory in Nicosia.

Career
Marios Elia spent almost his entire career playing for APOEL, where he won 7 Championships, 4 Cups, 6 Super Cups and appeared in four official 2009–10 UEFA Champions League group stage matches in APOEL's first UEFA Champions League participation. He also appeared in one 2011–12 UEFA Champions League match for APOEL, in the club's surprising run to the quarter-finals of the competition. In his last season (2013–14) as a player, APOEL's vice-captain managed to win all the season's trophies in Cyprus, the Cypriot League, the Cypriot Cup and the Cypriot Super Cup, retiring as a proud domestic treble winner.

Honours
 APOEL
Cypriot First Division (7) : 2001–02, 2003–04, 2006–07, 2008–09, 2010–11, 2012–13, 2013–14
Cypriot Cup (4) : 1998–99, 2005–06, 2007–08, 2013–14
Cypriot Super Cup (6) : 2002, 2004, 2008, 2009, 2011, 2013

References

External links

1979 births
Living people
Cypriot footballers
Cyprus international footballers
Association football defenders
APOEL FC players
Ethnikos Achna FC players
Doxa Katokopias FC players
Cypriot First Division players
Cypriot football managers